Paul Simm is an English musician, composer and record producer, known for his work with Amy Winehouse, the Sugababes and Neneh Cherry.

Biography
Paul Simm, discovered the piano aged five and mostly self-taught, by eleven was performing regular gigs.

He also took up trumpet, and later, after being approached by David Hinds of Steel Pulse, played & arranged horns for Grammy Award nominated album, Victims.

At twenty Simm, now London based & a full time session musician , played alongside Carleen Anderson, Pops Staples, Mica Paris, Baby D, Charles & Eddie and MC Solar whilst simultaneously working as a studio sound engineer.

He later replaced touring for the studio full-time, working on All Saints' debut album and co-writing and producing tracks for the Sugababes, including BRIT Award nominated single "Overload”.

Simm co-wrote Siobhán Donaghy’s top 20 debut single "Overrated" and has written & produced tracks for Amy Winehouse, Neneh Cherry, Mutya Buena, G. Love, Groove Armada, Beverley Knight and Tom Jones.

In 2002, Simm and co-writers McVey, Lipsey and Howard were awarded writing credits by ASCAP for the song "Make Over", which appeared on Christina Aguilera's Stripped following claims that it borrowed heavily from Sugababes' song "Overload".The track was originally listed as having been written solely by Aguilera and Linda Perry,

Simm has composed for commercials including work for Gucci, Bottega Veneta and Virgin

Virgin Souls
Simm is a member of band Virgin Souls, along with Cameron McVey, Silvio Pacini and Neil Pearson. The band was signed by Pete Tong to London Records and album 162 released in September 2003.

Current work
Simm co-wrote tracks for the Neneh Cherry albums, Blank Project. & Broken Politics

"Good Life" a song co-written with artist G.Love is released on his new album

"I lay down" & "Metal Heart" co-written & co-produced on The Sugababes The Lost Tapes album

References

External links
ASCAP listing
Official website
Paul Simm at Discogs

English record producers
English songwriters
Living people
Musicians from Birmingham, West Midlands
Year of birth missing (living people)